Tata Power SED (Tata Power Strategic Engineering Division) is an Indian defence manufacturing company and a part of the Tata Group. It was a unit of Tata Power until 2020, when Tata Advanced Systems acquired it from Tata Power. It was formerly known as Strategic Electronics Division.

Products and services

Pinaka MBRL
Tata Power SED is the lead contractor along with Larsen & Toubro Limited for the Pinaka Multi Barrel Rocket Launcher (MBRL) system.

Akash missile
Tata power SED is building the launchers for the Akash SAM systems for the Indian Air Force.

Arihant-class submarine
Tata Power SED built the control systems for the Arihant class of submarines.

MRSAM Airforce

ATAGS Gun System
Developing 155 x 52 cal Artillery Gun for the Indian Army.

Portable Diver Detection SONAR

ASAT Launcher

Military Airfield Modernization (MAFI)

Tata Power SED is also active in modernization of military airfields MAFI (Military Air Field Infrastructure) programme in the country. Recently, India's Ministry of Defence awarded a ₹1600 crore ($120 million) contract to the company to modernize 37 airfields in the country. Under the first phase of MAFI programme, the company has already upgraded 30 airfields.

References

Tata Group
Tata Power
Companies with year of establishment missing
Companies based in New Delhi